Regula Elsener (born 3 March 1975) is a Swiss journalist, author and former TV moderator from Schweizer Fernsehen (Swiss television).

Life 
Regula Elsener grew up in Thurgau. She has two daughters with her husband. Today she lives with her family near Uster.

Career 
As a 15-year-old, Regula Elsener wrote her first newspaper article. After graduating as a commercial clerk, she managed to switch to Swiss television at the age of 21. There she moderated various programs such as TAF, Weekend Music, Monte Carlo Circus Festival, Tagesschau Nacht and five times she hosted the Saturday evening show "Ein Abend mit ...."

In 1998, she was the billboard face of the weather show at RTL Switzerland for some months.

In 2005 she ended her career as a TV moderator. Today she works as a freelance journalist and event host.

Works 
 Sex and the City ist nicht alles – wie frau erwachsen wird, Orell Füssli Verlag, Zürich 2005, .

References

External links 
 Regula Elsener

1975 births
Living people
20th-century Swiss women
21st-century Swiss women
Swiss columnists
Swiss women columnists